Fermi–Dirac may refer to:

 Fermi–Dirac statistics or Fermi–Dirac distribution
 Fermi–Dirac integral (disambiguation)
 Complete Fermi–Dirac integral
 Incomplete Fermi–Dirac integral

See also
 Fermi (disambiguation)
 Dirac (disambiguation)